Chuck Holz (born 1952) is a Republican member of the Iowa House of Representatives, representing the 5th district.  Wheeler was first elected in a November 3, 2015 special election held to fill a vacancy created when Republican Representative Chuck Soderberg resigned upon moving out of district for a new job.

Holz was a member of the Le Mars School Board for 18 years, including 2 years as board president.

Electoral history

References

External links
 Chuck Holz at Iowa Legislature
 
 Biography at Ballotpedia

Date of birth missing (living people)
Place of birth missing (living people)
Living people
Republican Party members of the Iowa House of Representatives
21st-century American politicians
Iowa State University alumni
People from Le Mars, Iowa
1952 births
School board members in Iowa